Wu Yancong is a paralympic athlete from China competing mainly in category F46 high jump events.

He has competed in three Paralympics, firstly in 2000 where he competed in the triple jump and won the F46 high jump.  Four Years later in Athens he defended his high jump title.  The 2008 Summer Paralympics in his home country were a relative disappointment as he failed to win a medal in either the long jump or triple jump.

References

External links
 

Year of birth missing (living people)
Living people
Paralympic athletes of China
Paralympic gold medalists for China
Paralympic medalists in athletics (track and field)
Athletes (track and field) at the 2000 Summer Paralympics
Athletes (track and field) at the 2004 Summer Paralympics
Athletes (track and field) at the 2008 Summer Paralympics
Medalists at the 2000 Summer Paralympics
Medalists at the 2004 Summer Paralympics
Chinese male high jumpers
High jumpers with limb difference
Paralympic high jumpers
21st-century Chinese people